Mealey is a surname. Notable people with this surname include:
Brian Mealey, American periodontist
Damien Mealey, Australian cricketer
Jack Mealey, American baseball catcher
Katrina Mealey, American veterinary pharmacologist
Linda Mealey, American evolutionary psychologist
Natasha Mealey, English model
Phil Mealey, British actor
Rondell Mealey, American football player
Tobias Mealey, Canadian-born American entrepreneur

See also
Hotel Mealey, a historic building in Oelwein, Iowa
Tobias G. Mealey House, a historic house in Monticello, Minnesota
Mealey machine (also sometimes spelled Mealy Machine), a conceptual machine in computation theory